Linus Sebastian Seyd Ylvenius (born 16 October 1977) is a Swedish actor and screenwriter (2010 film Res dej inte! together with Erik Bolin and Richard Jarnhed).

After studying at Gothenburg Theatre Academy 1999–2003 Ylvenius has worked at among Stockholm City Theatre and Bohuslänsteater.

Selected filmography
1996 – Drömprinsen – Filmen om Em
1997 – Välkommen till festen
2003 – Kommissarie Winter (TV)
2004 – Fröken Sverige
2008 – Beck – Gamen
2009 – 183 dagar (TV)
2010 – Starke man (TV)
2010 – Res dej inte! (even screenwriter)

References

External links

Swedish male actors
Living people
1977 births
Swedish screenwriters
Swedish male screenwriters